Father Harry Bohan is an Irish Catholic priest, sociologist, and former manager of the Clare county hurling team.

The son of Michael Bohan, a Garda Síochána officer, and Anne Fitzgerald, who ran a pub, Bohan grew up in Feakle, County Clare. He was educated at St Flannan's College in Ennis and studied for the priesthood at Maynooth College. Bohan went on to study sociology in Cardiff, and obtained an MA from the University of Wales. Bohan is now the parish priest in Sixmilebridge, in County Clare.

In the 1970s, Bohan was manager of the Clare senior hurling team which won two National Hurling League titles, and more recently served as a selector for manager Anthony Daly. In 2006 he was recognised for his services to hurling by a special award.

A campaigner for Rural Ireland, he set up the Rural Resource Centre, and in 1998 he set up the Ceilfin Centre.

His brother Seamus is landlord of the family pub in Feakle.

His nephew Mick is a football coach.

Publications
 Swimming Upstream: Finding Positives in a Negative Ireland by Harry Bohan, Columbia University Press, 2013.
 Community and the Soul of Ireland: The Need for Values-based Change by Harry Bohan, 2002.
 The Challenge: Balance between City and Rural Life by Harry Bohan, Studies: An Irish Quarterly Review, Vol. 74, No. 295 (Autumn, 1985), pp. 267–280. Published by: Irish Province of the Society of Jesus.

References

Year of birth missing (living people)
Living people
Alumni of St Patrick's College, Maynooth
Hurling managers
Hurling selectors
Irish sociologists
People educated at St Flannan's College
20th-century Irish Roman Catholic priests
21st-century Irish Roman Catholic priests